Roman Andreyevich Rudenko (– January 23, 1981) was a Soviet lawyer and statesman. 

 Procurator-General of the Ukrainian Soviet Socialist Republic from 1944 to 1953, Rudenko became Procurator-General of the entire Soviet Union after 1953. He is well known internationally for acting as chief prosecutor for the USSR at the 1946 trial of the major Nazi war criminals in  Nuremberg. He was also chief prosecutor at the "Trial of the Sixteen" (Polish Underground leaders) held in Moscow the year before. At the time he served at Nuremberg, Rudenko held the rank of  Lieutenant-General within the USSR Procuracy.

In 1961 Rudenko was elected to the  CPSU Central Committee. In 1972 he was awarded the Soviet honorary title of Hero of Socialist Labor.

Ukrainian SSR to 1953
Rudenko was one of the chief commandants of NKVD special camp Nr. 7, a former Nazi concentration camp, until its closure in 1950. Of the 60,000 prisoners incarcerated there under his supervision, at least 12,000 died due to malnutrition and disease.

In October 1951, as Procurator-General of the Ukrainian SSR, he personally led prosecution in the trial of OUN member Mykhailo Stakhur who in October 1949 killed the writer Yaroslav Halan.

Soviet Union 1953–1981
After the arrest of  Lavrentiy Beria in 1953, Rudenko was a judge at the closed trial at which Stalin's last secret police chief was sentenced to death.

In 1960, he acted as the chief prosecutor in U-2 pilot Gary Powers's espionage trial.

As Procurator General of the Soviet Union, Rudenko played a major role in devising measures to deal with the growing dissident movement within the USSR. 

In 1967, he and then KGB chairman Vladimir Semichastny submitted proposals as to how to deal with those defending the writers Yuli Daniel and Andrei Sinyavsky during and after their trial, without provoking a strong reaction abroad or within the country. This included mention of the "mental illness" suffered by several prominent dissidents. One measure, proposed jointly with Yuri Andropov in late 1972, was to reduce the number of arrests and convictions by reinforcing the issue of "prophylactic" warnings to individuals, cautioning them that their activities could lead to prosecution under  Articles 70 and 1901 of the RSFSR Criminal Code.

References

Further reading
Robert E. Conot, Justice at Nuremberg, Carroll & Graf Publishers, 1984, 
 Александр Звягинцев. «Руденко». Молодая гвардия, 2007 г. 

1907 births
1981 deaths
People from Chernihiv Oblast
People from Chernigov Governorate
Second convocation members of the Verkhovna Rada of the Ukrainian Soviet Socialist Republic
Central Committee of the Communist Party of the Soviet Union members
Heroes of Socialist Labour
Prosecutors of the International Military Tribunal in Nuremberg
Soviet jurists
20th-century jurists
Prosecutors of the Ukrainian Soviet Socialist Republic